"Straight Through My Heart" is a song performed by American band Backstreet Boys. It was released by Jive Records as the lead single from the group's seventh studio album, This is Us. On July 23, 2009 the single received its world premier on the group's official website, since then it was sent to radio on July 28, 2009, before its digital release on August 19, 2009. It was later released as a CD single at the end of September 2009. "Straight Through My Heart" was certified Platinum by the Recording Industry Association of Japan in 2014.

Critical reception
Alex Fletcher of Digital Spy said "Fortunately, though the glitz and glamour may have faded somewhat, musically they appear to be undergoing a renaissance. If this RedOne-produced single is a fair representation, then their upcoming album may live up its billing as the band's best since 1999's Millennium. Fans who always preferred their banging pop tracks to the syrupy ballads will certainly be satisfied with this throbbing anthem, which has a chorus just begging for some old-school BSB dance moves." (3/5 stars) This Must Be Pop listed the song in their top 5 most underrated RedOne productions. The Song won "International Song of the Year" at the Japan Gold Disc Awards.

Music video
The video for "Straight Through My Heart" was filmed on August 7 and 8 of 2009 in downtown Los Angeles, California. It was directed by Kai Regan. It was released on August 27 over the internet. The introduction says, "Day Walkers: A group who band together to protect innocent mortals or Kine against the Gentry: Vampires who hunt for prey at bars and nightclubs. Sometimes these hunters become, The hunted.." After the introduction the song starts playing. A female vampire rides a motorcycle up to a nightclub and walks inside. The Backstreet Boys are performing inside the club. The vampire begins to hunt for victims as the Backstreet Boys start to sing. Just before the climax of the song, Carter notices that the vampire has a victim. At the climax, water, presumably holy water, pours down from the ceiling onto the crowd. This scares the vampire and Nick reaches out to her. He leads the vampire, with Littrell, McLean, and Dorough behind them, into another room. They lock the doors and open another one, throwing the vampire outside into the sunlight, destroying her. After destroying the vampire, the group walks out into the sun, revealing their enlarged teeth and red eyes.

Track listings
CD Single
 "Straight Through My Heart" (Main Version) — 3:28
 "Straight Through My Heart" (Instrumental) — 3:28

UK CD Single
 "Straight Through My Heart" (Main Version) — 3:28
 "Straight Through My Heart" (Dave Audé Radio Edit) — 3:53

Charts

Year-end charts

Certifications

Release history

References

2009 singles
2009 songs
Backstreet Boys songs
Synth-pop ballads
Song recordings produced by RedOne
Songs written by Bilal Hajji
Songs written by RedOne
Songs written by Kinnda